The Brazilian records in swimming are the fastest ever performances of swimmers from Brazil, which are recognised and ratified by Brazil's national swimming federation: Confederação Brasileira de Desportos Aquáticos (CBDA).

All records were set in finals unless noted otherwise.

The stroke names in Portuguese are:
freestyle = livre
backstroke = costas
breaststroke = peito
butterfly = borboleta
medley = medley

Long Course (50 m)

Men

Women

Mixed relay

Short Course (25 m)

Men

Women

Mixed relay

Notes

References

External links
 CBDA web site
 Brazilian Swimming Records 

Brazilian
Records
Swimming records
swimming